Agile Warrior F-111X is a video game developed by Black Ops and published by Virgin Interactive Entertainment for the PlayStation and Windows. It was the first title produced by the studio, initially developing the title from home before they gained their Santa Monica offices.

Gameplay
Agile Warrior is a F-111X flight simulator with half a dozen missions.

Reception

Next Generation reviewed the PlayStation version of the game, rating it two stars out of five, and stated that "if you stick with it, there is some fun to be had, but not enough to overcome the game's many small and large frustrations".

Previews
GameFan 35 (Vol 3, Issue 11) November 1995
GamePro (Dec, 1995)

Reviews
Game Revolution - Jun 05, 2004
GameSpot - Jan 23, 1997
All Game Guide - 1998
PC Player - Jun, 1997
Computer Games Magazine - 1997
IGN - Nov 21, 1996
Joypad (Feb, 1996) (French)
Electric Playground (1997)
PC Gameworld (1997)

Notes

References

External links
 Agile Warrior F-111X at GameFAQs 
 Agile Warrior F-111X at MobyGames

1995 video games
Black Ops Entertainment games
Combat flight simulators
Multiplayer and single-player video games
PlayStation (console) games
Video games developed in the United States
Virgin Interactive games
Windows games